Wendy C. Ortiz (born 1973) is an American essayist, creative nonfiction writer, fiction writer, psychotherapist, and poet.

Background 

Wendy C. Ortiz was born in Los Angeles, California in 1973. She earned her Bachelor of Arts in Liberal Arts from The Evergreen State College in 1995 and lived in Olympia, Washington for eight years before returning to Los Angeles where she presently resides. While living in Olympia, Washington, Ortiz was a mudwrestler, library worker, and editor and publisher of 4th Street, a handbound literary journal.

Ortiz earned her Master of Fine Arts in Creative Writing (2002) as well as her Master of Arts in Clinical Psychology (2010) from Antioch University in Los Angeles, California.

She was co-founder, curator and host of the Rhapsodomancy Reading Series, which began at the Good Luck Bar in Los Angeles in 2004 and continued through 2015. Ortiz was a Writer-in-Residence at Hedgebrook in 2007 and 2009. In 2015 she adapted a short play from her essay "Spell" in collaboration with and directed by Meera Menon for One Axe Productions. In Spring 2018, she served as visiting writer of creative nonfiction in the MFA Program at CalArts. Wendy is a psychotherapist in private practice.

Works 

Ortiz is the author of three books: Excavation: A Memoir, (Future Tense Books, 2014) Hollywood Notebook (Writ Large Press, 2015), and Bruja (Civil Coping Mechanisms, 2016). A second edition of Hollywood Notebook will be published by CCM and WritLarge Press in 2018.

Critical Reception 

Amy Sachs at Bustle named Excavation: A Memoir one of  "11 Groundbreaking Books About Women Making History With Their Thinking, Activism, And Courage" and JoAnna Novak at Bustle calls Ortiz, one of "9 Women Writers Who Are Breaking New Nonfiction Territory."

Of her books Excavation and Hollywood Notebook, Lesley Heiser at The Rumpus wrote, "With her bold books, Ortiz defies society to ignore her, to resist her. But we're becoming more and more aware of her. Her dark blossoming is changing us."

Of Hollywood Notebook, Jeva Lange at Electric Literature said, "The entire project becomes nearly reminiscent of the self-musings of Maggie Nelson, if Nelson were consulting astrological charts rather than philosophy…Hollywood Notebook, then, is a sui generis gem, and one to take advantage of immediately."

Ellie Robins at the Los Angeles Times called the prose in Bruja "spare and at times mesmerizing" and added, "Ortiz celebrates [the] dark side of the human mind, nowhere more so than in Bruja...It's testament to Ortiz's courage as a memoirist that she's willing to live for a while on this submarine plane, among the elements that dictate her fate — and to invite her readers along for the show."

The three books have appeared on a number of new books, best books, and other literary lists around the web. All three books are taught around the United States in various undergraduate and graduate creative writing programs.

My Dark Vanessa controversy 

On January 19, 2020, Ortiz helped generate a prepublicity firestorm over a then unpublished novel by Kate Elizabeth Russell titled My Dark Vanessa when she tweeted "can’t wait until February when a white woman’s book of fiction that sounds very much like Excavation is lauded, stephen king’s stamp of approval is touted, etc,." Although Ortiz is described as having acknowledged that she had not read Russell's fictional work, she would write an essay in which she alleged the novel's 'eerie story similarities' to her memoir. Excavation: A Memoir and My Dark Vanessa share themes of intergenerational sexual abuse by a teacher, yet the Associated Press has reported that 'Reviewers who looked at both books saw no evidence of plagiarism.' Nevertheless, in response to social media comments, and in the wake of the controversy over American Dirt, Oprah Winfrey, who had originally tapped My Dark Vanessa as a selection for her influential Book Club, rescinded the selection.

As a result of the accusations of plagiarism and appropriation, Russell made a public statement disclosing that My Dark Vanessa had been inspired by her own experiences with sexual abuse as a teenager

Bibliography 

Excavation: A Memoir,  Future Tense Books, 2014.

Hollywood Notebook,  Writ Large Press, 2015.

Bruja,  Civil Coping Mechanisms, 2016.

References

External links
 
 Rhapsodomancy homepage
 Review of Excavation: A Memoir in the Los Angeles Times
 Book Review of Hollywood Notebook in the Los Angeles Review of Books
 Book Review of Bruja in the Los Angeles Times
 Book Review in The Rumpus
 Interview with Arielle Greenberg in Aster(ix) Journal

Living people
1973 births
21st-century American poets
American women poets
Poets from California
Writers from Los Angeles
21st-century American women writers
21st-century American essayists
American women essayists